William Alexander Murray Grigor  (born 1939) is a Scottish film-maker, writer, artist, exhibition curator and amateur architect who has served as director of the Edinburgh International Film Festival. He has made over 50 films with a focus on arts and architecture.

Early life 
Grigor was born in 1939 in Inverness, and graduated from St Andrews University. He started his career as a film editor at the BBC which he left in 1967 to become director of the Edinburgh International Film Festival. He married, in 1968, Barbara Grigor, née Sternschein, a teacher of French and German, film maker, exhibition curator, and chairman of the Scottish Sculpture Trust with whom he had two daughters, Sarah, b 1970 and Phoebe, b 1972.  Barbara Grigor died in 1994. Grigor married Carol Colburn Grigor née Colburn in 2011.

Career 

With his wife Barbara and Peter Rush, Grigor devised the Scotch Myths exhibition, which was mounted at the Crawford Centre at the University of St Andrews in the Spring of 1981 and went on to feature in the programme of the Edinburgh International Festival.  Its exploration of popular representations of Scottish identity, notably Tartanry and the Kailyard, attracted much critical attention, influencing cultural and political debate in Scotland in the early 1980s.<ref>Paterson, Lindsay (1981), Scotch Myths - 2, in The Bulletin of Scottish Politics No. 2, Spring 1981, pp. 66 - 71</ref>  The exhibition inspired the three-day Scotch Reels event at the 1982 Edinburgh Film Festival, which explored representations of Scots and Scotland in cinema and television.Caughie, John (1983), From 'Scotch Reels' to the 'Highland Fling': The Fourth International Festival of Film and Television in the Celtic Countries, in Hearn, Sheila G. (ed.), Cencrastus No. 13, Summer 1983, pp. 40 - 42,  Grigor contributed to an accompanying book of essays entitled Scotch Reels: Scotland in Cinema and Television edited by Colin McArthur. The success of the exhibition also led Channel 4 to commission Grigor to write and direct the film Scotch Myths which was screened at the Festival of Film and Television from the Celtic Countries held in Glasgow in March 1983.

From the 1980s, Grigor widened his film focus to cover more international, and particularly American subjects, such as the 1986 landmark 8 part series Pride of Place with Robert A. M. Stern for the American television channel PBS.  In 1997, he directed the PBS series "The Face of Russia" with James Billington, the Librarian of Congress. "Contemporary Days" on the British designers Robin and Lucienne Day for Design Onscreen of Denver Colorado, was premiered at the Glasgow Film Festival in February 2011. "Ever to Excel" - a feature documentary with Sir Sean Connery was funded in America to mark the 600th anniversary of the University of St Andrews for its scholarship endowment campaign, and had its British premiere at the 2012 Glasgow Film Festival. It was followed by  sequel "Ever to Exceed' celebrating the achievements of St. Andrews' students, scholars and alumni. In 1976 he shot a video of Neil Young busking in Glasgow.

Grigor also worked as film producer and writer. Together with Barbara Grigor, he founded, in 1972, the film company Viz Ltd based in Inverkeithing, Scotland. Grigor has also written screenplays for all his films, and a number of exhibition catalogues to accompany his exhibitions. He was co-author of "The Architects' Architect" on C.R. Mackintosh with Richard Murphy and "Being a Scot" with Sir Sean Connery, published in 2008 and which is now published in 5 languages.  "Beatus – The Spanish Apocalypse" on the illuminated manuscripts of the Middle Ages on the Book of Revelation, was invited in competition to the 2015 Montréal Festival du Film sur L'Art – the 4th film Grigor has made in partnership with Hamid Shams, the American Director of Photography.

In 2008, Grigor produced seven film loops for Los Angeles' Hammer Gallery exhibition Between Earth and Heaven about the architecture of John Lautner, which coincided with the premiere of his documentary Infinite Space on the same subject.

 Appointments and awards 
He was appointed, in 2007, as a member of the Scottish Broadcasting Commission.

Grigor is a fellow of the Royal Society of Arts, and was the first film maker to be made an Honorary Fellow of the Royal Incorporation of Architects in Scotland and the Royal Institute of British Architects. Grigor is Visiting Professor of Film Studies at the Anglia Ruskin University, from which he received, in 2010, an Honorary Doctor of Arts.

Grigor was appointed Officer of the Order of the British Empire (OBE) in the 2012 New Year Honours for services to architecture and the film industry.

Selected filmography
Grigor has directed the following films.Search. National Library for Scotland

 References 

Further reading
 McArthur, Colin (1983), Tendencies in the New Scottish Cinema, in Hearn, Sheil G. (ed.), Cencrastus'' No. 13, Summer 1983, pp. 33 - 35,

External links 
 

Scottish documentary filmmakers
Scottish film directors
Alumni of the University of St Andrews
Officers of the Order of the British Empire
1939 births
Living people
Fellows of the Royal Incorporation of Architects in Scotland